Norman Donald Masters (September 19, 1933 – April 19, 2011) was an American football offensive tackle for the Green Bay Packers.
 
Born and raised in Detroit, Michigan, Masters graduated from its St. Mary of Redford High School, and played college football at Michigan State.  There he earned Consensus All America honors as a senior on the Spartans' 1955 squad that finished 9–1 with a Rose Bowl win over UCLA.

The Chicago Cardinals selected Masters in the second round of the 1956 NFL Draft, but he instead accepted an offer from the B.C. Lions of the CFL and played the 1956 season in Canada.  His hometown Detroit Lions acquired his rights for the 1957 season.  The Lions traded Masters to the Green Bay Packers in a six-player deal which included three linemen (Masters, tackle Ollie Spencer and guard Jim Salsbury) and halfback Don McIlhenny to the Packers for quarterback Tobin Rote and defensive back Val Joe Walker.

Masters was 6 feet 2 inches tall and weighed 249 pounds

Masters started at right tackle for the Packers in the 1961 NFL Championship Game, a 37–0 victory at home; it was the first of five NFL titles for head coach Vince Lombardi.

References

External links 
 
Obituary

1933 births
2011 deaths
All-American college football players
American football offensive tackles
Michigan State Spartans football players
Green Bay Packers players
BC Lions players
Players of American football from Detroit